St Mary's Church, Bleasby is a Grade II listed parish church in the Church of England in Bleasby, Nottinghamshire.

History

The church dates from the 13th century. It was restored in 1853, and again in 1869 by Ewan Christian.

It is in a joint parish with:
St James' Church, Halloughton
St Michael's Church, Hoveringham 
Priory Church of St. Peter, Thurgarton

Organ

The organ dates from 1863 by Gray & Davison. A specification of the organ can be found on the National Pipe Organ Register.

See also
Listed buildings in Bleasby, Nottinghamshire

References

Church of England church buildings in Nottinghamshire
Grade II listed churches in Nottinghamshire
Newark and Sherwood